Gyroporus purpurinus is a species of bolete fungus in the family Gyroporaceae. Found in eastern North America, it was first described in 1936 by Wally Snell as a form of Boletus castaneus. Snell and Rolf Singer transferred it to Gyroporus a decade later. Neither of these publications were valid according to the rules of botanical nomenclature, which at the time mandated a description in Latin. In 2013, Roy Halling and Naveed Davoodian published the name validly.

The species is edible.

See also
List of North American boletes

References

External links

Boletales
Edible fungi
Fungi described in 1936
Fungi of North America